Cassipourea eketensis is a species of plant in the Rhizophoraceae family. It is endemic to Nigeria and grows in tropical rainforest. It is threatened by habitat loss.

References

eketensis
Endemic flora of Nigeria
Critically endangered plants
Taxonomy articles created by Polbot